Mehman is a village in Aliabad Rural District, in the Central District of Hashtrud County, East Azerbaijan Province, Iran.

Mehman may refer to:

Mehman Aliyev, Director of Turan Information Agency, a Baku-based news agency
Mehman Azizov (born 1976), Azerbaijani judoka
Mehman Huseynov (born 1992), Azerbaijani journalist and human rights activist
Mehman Sayadov (1972-1992), Azeri fighter and National Hero of Azerbaijan, and the warrior of the Karabakh war

See also
Chak Mehman, a village in Dera Baba Nanak in Gurdaspur district of Punjab State, India
Mehman Duyeh, a village in Damankuh Rural District, in the Central District of Damghan County, Semnan Province, Iran